Miss USA 1991 was the 40th anniversary of the Miss USA pageant, televised live from the Century II Convention Center in Wichita, Kansas on February 22, 1991. At the conclusion of the final competition, Kelli McCarty of Kansas was crowned by outgoing titleholder Carole Gist of Michigan. Kelli became the first titleholder from Kansas and only the 3rd winner to be crowned as Miss USA in her home state.

The pageant was hosted by Dick Clark for the third of five years, with color commentary by Barbara Eden for the only time and Miss USA 1970 Deborah Shelton for the first time. 

This was the second of four years that the pageant was held in Wichita, Kansas.

This year was the first time that introduced the delegates in region by region and one by one in the Parade of States. The regions are The Midwest, The South, The Northeast, The Northwest, and The Southwest.

This year was also the last year that the 1st Runner-Up would go onto represent the US at Miss World as the Miss World Organization from this point forward stop accepting 1st Runner-Ups from Miss USA due to the pageant not making a public announcement that the 1st Runner-Up was going to compete at Miss World. Starting in 1992, a separate pageant would be held to determine the US delegate for Miss World.

Results

Placements

Color keys

Special awards

Historical significance 
 Kansas wins competition for the first time and surpasses its previous highest placement in 1973. Also becoming in the 24th state who does it for the first time.
 New Jersey earns the 1st runner-up position for the first time and surpasses its previous highest placement from the previous year, becoming its highest placement of the state.
 California earns the 2nd runner-up position for the second time. The last time it placed this was in 1972.
 Illinois finishes as Top 6 for the first time and reaches its highest placement since 1985.
 Oklahoma finishes as Top 6 for the first time.
 North Carolina finishes as Top 6 for the first time and reaches its highest placement since 1975.
 States that placed in semifinals the previous year were Illinois and New Jersey.
 Illinois placed for the eighth consecutive year. 
 New Jersey placed for the third consecutive year. 
 Arizona, California and Oklahoma last placed in 1989.
 North Carolina last placed in 1986.
 Hawaii last placed in 1985.
 Oregon last placed in 1984.
 New York last placed in 1983.
 Alabama last placed in 1981.
 Kansas last placed in 1973.
 Georgia breaks an ongoing streak of placements since 1986.
 Texas breaks an ongoing streak of placements since 1975.
 The national anthem starts the show as a preamble to the pageant, honoring the United States Armed Forces.

Scores

Preliminary competition
The following are the contestants' scores in the preliminary competition.

 Winner
 First runner-up
 Second runner-up
 Top 6 Finalist
 Top 11 Semifinalist

Final competition

 Winner
 First runner-up
 Second runner-up
 Top 6 Finalist

Delegates
The Miss USA 1991 delegates were:

 Alabama - Candice Carley
 Alaska - Tiffany Smith
 Arizona - Maricarroll Verlinde
 Arkansas - Angela Rockwell
 California - Diane Schock
 Colorado - Melanie Ness
 Connecticut - Valorie Abate
 Delaware - Laurie Lucidonio
 District of Columbia - LaKecia Smith
 Florida - Rosa Velilla
 Georgia - Tamara Rhodes
 Hawaii - Kym Lehua Digmon
 Idaho - Lori Easley
 Illinois - Lisa Morgan
 Indiana - Cathi Bennett
 Iowa - Heather Bowers
 Kansas - Kelli McCarty
 Kentucky - Susan Farris
 Louisiana - Melinda Murphy
 Maine - Melissa Oliver
 Maryland - Lisa Marie Lawson
 Massachusetts - Laura Wheeler
 Michigan - Leann Pothi
 Minnesota - April Herke
 Mississippi - Mitzi Swanson
 Missouri - Tiffany Hazell
 Montana - JoAnn Jorgensen
 Nebraska - Ziba Ayeen
 Nevada - Jodi Jensen
 New Hampshire - Adriana Molinari
 New Jersey - Charlotte Ray
 New Mexico - Tiffany Danton
 New York - Maureen Murray
 North Carolina - Pat Arnold
 North Dakota - Mischelle Chistensen
 Ohio - Amy Glaze
 Oklahoma - Julie Khoury
 Oregon - Olga Calderon
 Pennsylvania - Adrienne Romano
 Rhode Island - Lynda Michael
 South Carolina - Traci Rufty
 South Dakota - Jillayne Fossum
 Tennessee - Angela Johnson
 Texas - Chris Bogard
 Utah - Patti Jo Bender
 Vermont - Margaret Corey
 Virginia - Traci Dority
 Washington - LaNae Williams
 West Virginia - Krista Ransbottom
 Wisconsin - Kimberly Totdahl
 Wyoming - Wendy Lee Dunn

Crossovers
Delegates who had previously held a Miss America state title or would later win one were:
Kimberly Totdahl (Wisconsin) - Miss Wisconsin 1989
Joann Kayleen Jorgensen (Montana) - Miss Montana 1992
Valorie Abate (Connecticut) - Miss Connecticut 1992 (Non-Finalist Talent Award at Miss America)
Delegates who had previously competed in the Miss Teen USA pageant were:
Julie Khoury (Oklahoma) - Miss Oklahoma Teen USA 1985
Maureen Murray (New York) - Miss New Hampshire Teen USA 1983
Olga Calderon (Oregon) - Miss Oregon Teen USA 1985
Jillayne Fossum (South Dakota) - Miss South Dakota Teen USA 1988
Delegates who would go onto compete at the Miss World America pageant:
Maricarroll Verlinde (Arizona) - Miss Arizona World 1992
Lori Easley (Idaho) - Miss Idaho World 1992
Laura Wheeler (Massachusetts) - Miss Massachusetts World 1992
Jillayne Fossum (South Dakota) - Miss South Dakota World 1992
Krista Ransbottom (West Virginia) - Miss West Virginia World 1992

Judges
Lynn Swann
Sheila Manning
Lorianne Crook
Don Crichton
Guy Lee
Sharyn Skeeter
Joe Walsh
C. Howard Wilkins, Jr.
Adrienne Barbeau

See also
 Miss Teen USA 1991

References

External links
 Official website
 Miss USA 1991 at IMDb
 MISS USA 1991 CROWN GOES TO STUDENT AT WICHITA STATE

1991
February 1991 events in the United States
1991 beauty pageants
1991 in Kansas
1991
Mass media in Wichita, Kansas